Mongolia made its Winter Paralympic début at the ninth Winter Paralympics in Turin, Italy. The country was represented by one athlete competing in one sport, and did not win any medals.

Events

Nordic skiing
 men's 10km standing: Nyamaa Sukhbaatar
 men's 5km standing: Nyamaa Sukhbaatar

Medalists

See also
2006 Winter Paralympics
Mongolia at the 2006 Winter Olympics

References

External links
Torino 2006 Paralympic Games
International Paralympic Committee

Nations at the 2006 Winter Paralympics
2006
Winter Paralympics